Airplane Mode is a 2019 American surreal action comedy film directed by David Dinetz and Dylan Trussell, and written by Dinetz, Trussell, Logan Paul and Jake Paul. Logan Paul portrays the main character, a fictionalized version of himself, who is put in a situation where he has to overcome his fear of flying in order to land a plane containing a group of famous social media influencers. Chloe Bridges, Stephen Guarino, Arielle Vandenberg, Kevin Heffernan, Nick Swardson, Mikaela Hoover, Chris Wylde and Erik Griffin have supporting roles in the film, and it was also the final screen credit for Beverly Polcyn, who died 16 days after the film's release, at the age of 90.

Filming began in 2016, and it was supposed to be released a year later. However, the film was shelved due to the controversy surrounding Logan Paul and the suicide forest video, and it was eventually released on August 2, 2019, on iTunes. Airplane Mode only has one professional review, which was negative, and it was widely panned by YouTube commentary channels. It is considered one of the worst films of all time. In December 2020, Logan Paul was sued for upwards of $3 million after his controversial Suicide Forest video led to the companies exclusive publishing deal with Google to be suspended. Planeless Pictures, who secured a deal with the popular influencer in 2016, believes that Paul uploaded the Suicide Forest video in a deliberate attempt to sabotage the film's production, claiming that Paul should be held responsible for paying back the production company's losses.

Plot 

YouTuber Logan Paul is videocalling his Australian girlfriend, Ariel, with whom he has an online relationship. The two attempt to have cybersex, but are interrupted from doing so, firstly by Logan's foreign exchange brother Juanpa Zurita, and secondly by Lele Pons who tries to capture Logan's face when he is masturbating. Logan's friends tell him of a convention consisting of social media influencers called "Hashtagacon", which is being held in Sydney, giving him a chance to finally meet Ariel. However, he has to get over his fear of flying, which was set off ten years ago when Juanpa told him to jump from a tree as part of a YouTube stunt.

Logan, Juanpa and Andrew Bachelor take a taxi to the airport, and Andrew tells Logan that prankster Vitaly Zdorovetskiy will be on the same flight, as he is being extradited back to Australia to be put on trial for an incident involving dingoes. Juanpa goes to immigration where the customs officer believes that he is an illegal immigrant, and deports him back to Mexico, although Juanpa convinces him to deport him to Australia as he is desperate to lose his virginity. Logan goes through customs smoothly, but his fear of flying gets the better of him and has to be forced to get on the plane by his friends. Logan takes his seat next to a woman named Jenna, who has similar femur scars as him, and she holds his hand as the plane is about to take off. The pilots announce over the intercom that all passengers should put their smartphones on airplane mode, which they refuse to do. The phone signals causes havoc within the plane's wiring, resulting in the pilots getting electrocuted to their death. One of the flight attendants, Clarice, looks through the peephole, walks in and then immediately walks out, thinking that the pilots are having oral sex.

Logan asks for Jenna's Instagram handle, but she tells him that she is not on social media, before realizing that he is part of the "Hashtagacon" group. Logan plays this down and says that he is actually on the flight to meet his girlfriend for the first time. Jenna asks Logan about his girlfriend and how he can love someone that he has not met. Logan tells her that Ariel is the only person that can make him snort while laughing. Jenna proves to Logan that she can do the same thing, and flings a chocolate mousse at a sleeping passenger across the aisle, making him snort as well. Jenna then goes to sleep, using Logan's shoulder as a makeshift pillow. Hours later, Clarice discovers that the co-pilots are actually dead, and gets the air marshal over to the cockpit to deal with the situation, leaving Vitaly on his own. Logan gets up from his seat and overhears the conversation in the cockpit. He opens the door and asks if everything is okay, but freaks out when he realizes that the pilots are dead. Suddenly Vitaly appears, killing the air marshal by breaking his neck, while Clarice and Logan both faint and collapse on the floor.

Logan wakes up in the cockpit and goes to find Juanpa to see if he can help him, but he is incapable of doing so. Realizing that his friends would also be the same way, Logan wakes Jenna up from her sleep and gets her to go to the cockpit with him. Jenna freaks out over the situation, while Logan decides to try and find the flight attendants, who are bound and gagged in the cargo by Vitaly. However, Logan chickens out and it is only when Jenna berates him that he decides to come back. He calls the air traffic controller in Sydney, and tells him that the pilots are dead and the flight attendants are missing. The air traffic controller named Benji, suggests using the auto-pilot stick which Logan had broken in a panic, but when Logan tells him that they cannot use that, Benji cannot help them anymore and goes on a lunch break. Meanwhile, Vitaly wants to know where the emergency oxygen supply is, and proceeds to feed a dog cat food, so Clarice tells him where it is. Vitaly opens the cargo door, and says that it was dog food the whole time; it was just in a tin used for cat food. He then throws Clarice out of the plane, before saying his catchphrase, "It's just a prank, bro!".

Vitaly opens the emergency door, and Andrew, who is more concerned with filming himself than being in his seat, is the second person to be thrown out of the plane. Nick Bateman makes an inspiring speech to the passengers and as he is a junior pilot, he will save the day or die trying. As soon as he walks through the curtain, he is stabbed in the front by Vitaly. As established in an earlier scene (for reasons which are unexplained), Logan has the ability to read the minds of gay people, and through the male flight attendant, Bruce, he prevents Jenna from using the oxygen mask, since Vitaly replaced it with chloroform. Logan and Vitaly fight each other in the plane, where it is revealed that the "Hashtagacon" convention is all just an elaborate prank, and Vitaly knocks him out with a fire extinguisher. When Logan comes to, Bruce tells him that Vitaly has the only parachute on board, who opens the cargo door to get rid of them. However, they are saved by Logan's pet parrot, Maverick. Bruce advises Logan to use the autopilot, to which Logan awkwardly laughs, as he had broken off the autopilot stick. Vitaly commandeers the plane, bringing it further into the sky, so he can make his escape. Jenna's hands are tied but she manages to hand Logan the autopilot stick, which he throws into Vitaly's chest, who laughs it off as a flesh wound. Vitaly's parachute is released and he is killed when he is flung backwards into the engine.
Logan uses Jenna's smartphone to watch a YouTube instructional video on how to land a plane, although it too ends with the same advice Benji and Bruce had given him: use the autopilot. Benji then calls the cockpit, telling Logan that he is surprised they made it this far and that he should just land the plane on the white line, fly straight and hope that they do not explode on contact, all while insulting Logan, much to his frustration. Although they land successfully on the runway, the plane fails to stop, so Logan has to quickly watch the instruction video to slam on the brakes at the last minute. Then, the engine explodes just as Logan and Jenna are about to kiss. As everyone gets off the plane, Logan meets Benji, who he promptly headbutts. He also runs into Juanpa, who spent most of the flight getting drunk and trying to have sex with Brittany Furlan. Logan and Jenna say their goodbyes, and Logan realizes that he actually has feelings for her and not Ariel. Logan and Juanpa drive to Ariel's house, and he decides to put Juanpa in his place instead. Ariel figures out right away that Juanpa is not Logan, but decides to have sex with him anyway as he has an accent. As Juanpa is about to climax, they are caught in the act by Ariel's (adoptive) father, who chases Juanpa around the bedroom before he jumps out of the window and runs off naked. Logan arrives at the hotel room Jenna is staying in, but assumes she has made up with her "boyfriend", Richie. However, as Logan leaves the room, he immediately knows that Richie is gay and runs back in, kicks Richie out who is confused as to why Logan can hear his thoughts. Logan then makes out with Jenna and the two have sex.

In a mid-credits scene, Juanpa is seen running across another beach (with only a couple of leaves covering his genitals) and chases after a kangaroo. Logan arrives at the house of the boy whose instructional video he watched, and kicks down the door which knocks out the boy's sister. Finally, Andrew is shown to have survived the whole ordeal, washing up on another beach and then starts making out with a sex doll.

Cast 

The following social media personalities play fictionalized versions of themselves: Lele Pons, Andrew Bachelor, Amanda Cerny, Nick Bateman, Jon Paul Piques, Brittany Furlan, Vitaly Zdorovetskiy, Jérôme Jarre, David Dobrik, Alex Wassabi, Anwar Jibawi, Kyle Myers, Curtis Lepore, Lauren Elizabeth, Jerry LaBranche and Paige Ginn.

Reception 
Eric D. Snider of Crooked Marquee gave the film a D+, concluding, "We may think that as a society we have done nothing to deserve the image of a lactating Nick Swardson, but we are fooling ourselves. This is who we are."

See also 
Soul Plane

References

External links 
 
 
 

2019 films
2019 action comedy films
2010s parody films
2010s disaster films
2010s romantic action films
2019 romantic comedy films
American romantic comedy films
American aviation films
American disaster films
American action comedy films
American parody films
American adventure films
Surreal comedy films
Films about aviation accidents or incidents
Films about social media
Films set in Los Angeles
Films set in Sydney
Films set on airplanes
Films shot in Los Angeles
2010s English-language films
2010s American films
Logan Paul